Benjamin Cohen may refer to:

 Sir Benjamin Cohen, 1st Baronet (1844–1909), British politician and Jewish communal leader, MP for Islington East, 1892–1906
 Benjamin V. Cohen (1894–1983), American political figure, member of President Franklin D. Roosevelt's Brain Trust
 Benjamin Cohen (political economist) (born 1937), American professor of International Political Economy
 Benjamin Cohen (born 1972), French musician known as Benjamin Diamond
 Benjamin Cohen (journalist) (born 1982), British journalist and Channel 4 news correspondent

See also
 Ben Cohen (disambiguation)